The Jewish Week is a weekly independent community newspaper targeted towards the Jewish community of the metropolitan New York City area. The Jewish Week covers news relating to the Jewish community in NYC. In March 2016, The Jewish Week announced its partnership with the online newspaper The Times of Israel. Later in 2016, The Jewish Week acquired the New Jersey Jewish News. In July 2020, The Jewish Week suspended publication of its weekly print publication, and in January 2021 announced its acquisition by 70 Faces Media, the publisher of the Jewish Telegraphic Agency and other Jewish brands, under whose umbrella it continues as an all-digital brand.

Editorial staff
Gary Rosenblatt was the editor and publisher from 1993 to 2019.  Andrew Silow-Carroll took over in September 2019. Rosenblatt served as editor at large and continued to write for the paper and be involved in several of its educational projects.
Phillip Ritzenberg was publisher and editor until 1993.

Programs
The Jewish Week runs a number of signature programs: Write On For Israel, a seminar program on Israel- and Jewish-related issues for high school students; The Conversation, an annual retreat for top and emerging thought-leaders in Jewish life; Fresh Ink For Teens, a publication and website by and for young Jewish journalists, and an annual series of Public Forums. Each year The Jewish Week publishes "36 Under 36," honoring younger New Yorkers making a difference in Jewish philanthropy, education, the arts, religion and social action.

Awards
The Jewish Week won two first-place awards from the American Jewish Press Association in 2021.

In 2016, The Jewish Week became a finalist for awards in two categories by the Deadline Club, the New York City chapter of the Society of Professional Journalists, for its series on the battle to improve secular education in chasidic schools. The series was done in partnership with WNYC.

In 2000, Rosenblatt and the newspaper won the Casey Medal for Meritorious Journalism from the Journalism Center on Children & Families for the story "Stolen Innocence", an investigative report that uncovered allegations of decades of child abuse by a youth movement leader and high school principal, Baruch Lanner. The story was criticized by some in the Orthodox community for being "malicious gossip".

References

External links

Jewish newspapers published in the United States
Jews and Judaism in New York City
Newspapers published in New York City
Weekly newspapers published in the United States